The 1st Mechanized Brigade "Argedava" (Brigada 1 Mecanizată "Argedava") is a brigade of the Romanian Land Forces. It was initially formed as the 34th Infantry Regiment, and named after the Moldavian Voivode Vasile Lupu.

The brigade is considered the best and most modern infantry brigade in the Romanian Land Forces; its headquarters are located in Bucharest. The 1st Brigade has two paratroop companies in its subordination. The structural reorganization process of the unit was completed in 2010.

Organization 2020 
 1st Mechanized Brigade "Argedava", in Bucharest
 114th Tank Battalion "Petru Cercel", in Târgoviște
 2nd Infantry Battalion "Călugăreni", in Bucharest
 495th Infantry Battalion "Căpitan Ștefan Soverth", in Clinceni
 113th Artillery Battalion "Bărăganul", in Slobozia
 288th Anti-aircraft Defense Battalion, in Focșani
 117th Logistic Support Battalion "Colonel Alexandru Polyzu", in Negoiești

References

External links
   Official Site of the Romanian Land Forces
  Official Site of the 1st Infantry Division

Brigades of Romania